Lava and his twin brother Kusha, are the children of Rama and Sita in Hindu tradition. Their story is recounted in the Hindu epic, Ramayana and its other versions. He is said to have a whitish golden complexion like their mother, while Kusha had a blackish complexion like their father.

Birth and childhood

The first chapter of Ramayana, Balakanda, mentioned Valmiki narrating the Ramayana to his disciples, Lava and Kusha. But their birth and childhood story is mentioned in the last chapter 'Uttara Kanda''' which is not believed to be the original work of Valmiki. According to the legend, Sita banished herself from the kingdom due to the gossip of the kingdom folk about her sanctity. She chose self-exile and took refuge in the ashram of Valmiki located on the banks of the Tamsa river. Lava and Kusha were born at the ashram and were educated and trained in military skills under the teachings of Sage Valmiki. In which the time they had also learned the story of Rama.

During an Ashvamedha Yagya held by Rama, Sage Valmiki along with Lava and Kusha, attended with Sita in disguise.

In some versions of the epic, Lava and Kusha chanted the Ramayana in the presence of Rama and a vast audience. When Lava and Kusha recited about Sita's exile, Rama became grief-stricken and Valmiki produced Sita. Sita, struck with embarrassment and grief, called upon the earth, her mother (Bhumi), to receive her and as the ground opened, she vanished into it. Rama then learnt that Lava and Kusha were his children, whom he meets after 12 years after their birth as mentioned in Valmiki Ramayana.

In some versions, Lava and Kusha capture the horse of the sacrifice and went to defeat Rama's brothers (Lakshmana, Bharata and Shatrughna) and their armies. When Rama came to fight with them, Sita intervenes and unites father and sons.

Later life

Lava and Kusha became rulers after their father Rama founded the cities of Lavapuri and Kasur, respectively. The king of Kosala, Rama, installed his son Lava at Shravasti and Kusha at Kushavati.

In popular culture
Lava is purported to have founded Lavapuri'' (the modern day city of Lahore), which is named after him.

There is a temple associated with Lava (or Loh) inside Shahi Qila, Lahore.

There are various communities and clans in modern India that claim descent from Lava, an example being the "Levas", a branch of which are the Leva Patidars and Leuva Marathas.

References

Solar dynasty
Characters in the Ramayana